Leslie Cohen Berlowitz (March 1, 1944 – June 13, 2020) was President and Chief Executive Officer of the American Academy of Arts and Sciences. 
Berlowitz became the Academy's executive officer in 1996 and was later promoted to Chief Executive Officer and President. From 1969 to 1996, Berlowitz was an administrator at New York University.  In 2013 the Boston Globe pointed to a falsification of her degree on Academy grant applications and that her Academy salary appeared higher than standards at comparable institutions. The Globe also brought her draconian management style into question.

Education
Berlowitz graduated from the Fieldston School, and received a bachelor's degree from New York University and a master's degree from Columbia University.  
She was named an honorary Doctor of Humane Letters by Northeastern University in May 2011.

American Academy leadership
As chief executive, Berlowitz won praise for increasing Academy revenues, expanding the scope of programs, and raising the Academy's national profile, though questions about her management style and  allegedly poor treatment of employees followed her for years. Berlowitz led the Academy's Strategic Plan "2001 and Beyond" and the development of the Initiative for the Humanities and its Humanities Indicators. She created a network of more than 50 University Affiliates to work with the Academy on issues vital to the higher education community and also established two residential fellowship programs for young scholars: the Visiting Scholars Program and the Hellman Fellowship in Science and Technology Policy.

Resignation
In June 2013, Berlowitz was accused by the Boston Globe of embellishing her résumé in the course of writing grant proposals for the American Academy, falsely claiming to have earned a PhD degree in English from New York University.  Berlowitz was also accused of drawing excessive compensation and manipulating the Academy's election process. Following calls by the Washington Post and the Boston Globe for her resignation, Berlowitz resigned her position in July 2013. In the wake of press attacks on Berlowitz, however, former Ambassador to Afghanistan and U.S. Army Lt. General Karl Eikenberry and former Tennessee Governor Phil Bredesen wrote to the Boston Globe in her support.

Selected works
The Common Reader published a version of a chapter of Berlowitz's forthcoming book Bernard Malamud: The Limits of Desire. Berlowitz has also co-edited three books: Restoring Trust in American Business (Cambridge: MIT Press, 2005) with Jay W. Lorsch and Andy Zelleke, America in Theory (New York: Oxford University Press, 1988) with Denis Donoghue and Louis Menand, and Greenwich Village: Culture and Counterculture (New Jersey: Rutgers University Press, 1990) with Richard Eric Beard.

References

External links
Leslie Berlowitz Website
 Official Website – American Academy of Arts and Sciences 
 American Academy Commission on the Humanities and Social Sciences
 Humanities Resource Center Online – Humanities Indicators
 Investigation documents concerning the resignation

Columbia University alumni
Fellows of the American Academy of Arts and Sciences
Place of birth missing
American women chief executives
Year of birth missing
1940s births
2020 deaths
New York University alumni
21st-century American women